The Mosaic of Reḥob, also known as the Tel Rehov inscription and the Baraita of the Boundaries, is a late 3rd–6th century CE mosaic discovered in 1973. The mosaic, written in archaic Hebrew, describes the geography and agricultural rules of the local Jews of the era. The mosaic contains the longest written text yet discovered in any Hebrew mosaic in Palestine, and also the oldest known Talmudic text.

Unlike other mosaics found in the region, the Reḥob mosaic has very little in the form of ornate design and symmetric patterns, but is unique due to its inscription. The inscription is considered by scholars to be one of the most important epigraphical findings discovered in the Holy Land in the last century. Its text sheds invaluable light on the historical geography of Palestine during the Late Roman and Byzantine periods, as well as on Jewish and non-Jewish ethnographic divisions in Palestine for the same periods. 

The mosaic describes the body of Jewish law regulating the use of farm products grown in different regions. In Jewish tradition, certain laws are only applicable within the Land of Israel proper. By delineating the boundaries of the Land of Israel at the time, the mosaic seeks to establish the legal status of the country in its various parts from the time of the Jewish people's return from the Babylonian captivity. It describes whether or not local farm products acquired by Jews from various sources are exempt from the laws of Seventh Year produce, and gives guidelines for dealing with demai produce (produce whose tithing status is uncertain).

History
The mosaic was located in an ancient synagogue in the remains of Late Roman and Byzantine-period Jewish village located about one kilometre (half mile) northwest of Tel Rehov in what is now northeast Israel. The area preserved the old name in the form of Rehov (Hebrew) or Roob/Roōb (Latin).

According to excavator F. Vitto, the village synagogue underwent three phases of construction and reconstruction. It was first built as a basilical hall in the 4th century CE. The hall was destroyed by a fire and rebuilt in the following century, with the addition of a bemah, of a new mosaic floor and a plaster coating for the walls and pillars, decorated with several inscriptions. In the last phase, dating to the 6th or 7th century CE, the narthex was added, on whose floor the mosaiced inscription was laid. Others put the creation of the halakhic inscription in the late 3rd century CE at the earliest. The synagogue was probably abandoned after being destroyed in an earthquake.

The site of the ancient Jewish village was later the location of the Palestinian village of Farwana, documented at least since the Ottoman period, and depopulated during the 1948 war. Kibbutz Ein HaNetziv was established in 1946 on land including the ancient site.

The remains of the ancient synagogue were first discovered by members of Kibbutz Ein HaNetziv while preparing their lands for cultivation in the late 1960s. An archaeological excavation of the site in 1973, led by a team under IAA's Fanny Vitto, revealed the mosaic and its content, which has been on display at the Israel Museum in Jerusalem since 1978.

Description of mosaic
The mosaic pieces are made of black limestone tesserae contrasted against a white background. It begins with the salutation Shalom ("Peace") followed by a long halakhic text, and ends with Shalom once more. It is followed by an appendix where it lists some eighteen towns in the vicinity of Sebaste (the ancient city of Samaria) whose fruits and vegetables were exempt from tithes and the stringencies applied to Seventh Year produce. There is little uniformity in the size of the letters, and the spelling of some words is faulty. Portions of the main text contain elements that are related to late second-century rabbinic literature, particularly that found in the Tosefta (Shevi'it 4:8–11), the Jerusalem Talmud (Demai 2:1; Shevi'it 6:1) and Sifrei on Deuteronomy 11:24, although the mosaic of Reḥob expands on aspects of each. Some scholars have raised the hypothesis that the content of the mosaic was copied from a letter sent by the Sages of Israel to the heads of the synagogue. At any rate, it is the largest known text found on any Hebrew mosaic in Israel to date, as well as the oldest known Talmudic text. The more ancient text in the Reḥob mosaic has been used to correct errors in transmission of extant rabbinic texts.

From a philological perspective, the system of spelling in the mosaic follows the Beth-Shean practice of enunciation, where ʻayin is often interchanged with aleph, and ḥet is often interchanged with he, as is alluded to in the Jerusalem Talmud (Berakhot 2:4).

Legal (halakhic) background

The text in the Reḥob mosaic is best understood in the context of Jewish law at the time, which required the tithing of agricultural produce six years out of a seven-year cycle, as well as the observance of Seventh Year law strictures on the same produce once in every seven years. 

The underlying principle in Jewish law states that when the Jewish exiles returned from the Babylonian captivity in the 6th century BCE, the extent of territories resettled by them in Galilee and in Judea did not equal nor exceed the territory originally conquered by the Jewish people at the time of Joshua, more commonly referred to as "those who came-up from Egypt." The eight regions described by the mosaic are: the area of Scythopolis (modern-day Beit She'an) and the Jordan valley, Susita (Hippos) and its neighbouring settlements on the east bank of the Sea of Galilee, Naveh (Nawā) in the Roman province of Arabia Petraea, Tyre and its neighbouring cities to the south, the Land of Israel proper, the cities of Paneas and Caesarea, and finally villages from the vicinity of Sebaste.

The practical bearing of this restructuring of boundaries (although still part of the biblical Land of Israel proper) meant that places then settled by non-Jewish residents in the land (whether Phoenicians, Syrians, Grecians, or otherwise) and not taken by Israel were not deemed as consecrated land. Therefore, fruits and vegetables grown in such places and purchased by Jews were exempt from the laws of tithing, and of Seventh Year restrictions. However, if fruits and vegetables were purchased by gentile vendors from Israelites in their respective places and transported into these non-consecrated places in order to be sold in the marketplaces, they were still made subject to tithing as demai-produce by prospective Jewish buyers.

Beit She'an was a frontier city along the country's eastern front with Transjordan, and since it was not initially settled by Israelites upon their return from Babylon (although later Israelites had joined the local inhabitants) all home-grown fruits and vegetables there were made exempt from tithing in the days of Rabbi Judah HaNasi. Rabbi Judah HaNasi also made Beit Gubrin exempt from tithes and from the seventh-year observance, since that stretch of country had been settled by the Idumaeans (Esau's descendants) when the Jewish people returned from the Babylonian captivity.

Translation of ancient text

[Excursus: The agricultural products named above were not cultivated in Beit She'an, but were brought into the city by donkey drivers (either Jewish rustics or non-Jews) who had bought them from Jewish planters in other regions of the country to be sold in the marketplace of Beit She'an. To this list can be added the special fruits peculiar to the Hebrew nation and mentioned in Mishnah (Demai 2:1), if perchance they were acquired by a Jew from his fellow co-religionist who was unskillful in the laws of his countrymen, such as a cultivar of dates grown only in Israel, cakes of dried figs that were prepared strictly in Israel, and carob-fruit of a quality found only in Israel. In this case, they too would require the removal of the tithe known as demai. All other fruits and vegetables cultivated in Beit She'an would have been exempt from tithing altogether; when Rabbi Judah HaNasi permitted the eating of vegetables in the Seventh Year in Beit She'an, it was a release from the Seventh Year obligations and the release from tithing all produce throughout the remaining six years of the seven-year cycle.]
(Translation of text - con't.)

[Excursus: The import of detailing the above frontier towns and villages was to show the boundaries of the Land of Israel as retained by the Jews who returned from the Babylonian captivity. Where agricultural produce was prohibited from Jews living in these areas, this implies that these places were originally part of those places settled by the returnees from Babylon. Since the land was consecrated by their arrival in those parts, all fruits and vegetables were prohibited until the time that they could be tithed, and the land was required to lie fallow during the Seventh Year. However, where the places were designated as "dubious," this is explained in the Tosefta (Shevi'it 4:8) as meaning that initially these places were permitted (as there was no requirement to tithe produce grown in these places). Later, Jewish leaders made all fruits and vegetables in these places prohibited until they were first tithed.]

Regulation of produce between Achziv (Chezib) and Tyre
The maritime city of Akko (Ptolemais), and the river south of Achziv (Chezib), a small coastal town ca.  north of Acre, according to the Mishnah (Demai 1:3 and Gittin 1:2), were the extent of the northern boundary settled by Jews returning from the Babylonian captivity in the days of Ezra. Produce locally grown in the country beyond Achziv was exempt from the rules of demai-produce, but if purchased from Achziv itself, it required tithing. Although the towns and villages (listed below) were traditionally outside of the territorial bounds occupied by Jews returning from Babylonia, these cities nevertheless attracted Jewish settlement. In addition, fruits and vegetables grown in the Land of Israel were often transported northward, along the route known as the Promontory of Tyre (Heb. סולמות של צור). Israelites who frequented these areas, or who had moved there, were likely to buy fruits that had not been properly tithed in Israel, or had been marketed during the sabbatical year.
(Translation of text - con't.)

Boundary of the Land of Israel in the 5th c. BCE
The following frontier cities once marked the boundary of the Land of Israel, or the extent of places repopulated after the return from Babylonian exile. In a broader sense, the list of frontier towns and villages herein named represent the geographical limits of regulations imposed upon all agricultural produce, making them fully liable to tithing and to sabbatical-year restrictions within that same border, or, in the event of being purchased from the common people of the land, to separate therefrom only the demai-tithe. As one moved further east of Achziv, the border extended northward, into what are now portions of south Lebanon, and as far east as places in the present-day Kingdom of Jordan. While the settlements here named reflect a historical reality, bearing heavily on Jewish legal law (Halacha), they did not always reflect a political reality.
(Translation of text - con't.)

[Excursus: Jose ben Joezer of Ẓareda and Jose ben Yoḥanan of Jerusalem decreed defilement in respect of the country of the gentiles (BT, Shabbat 14b), meaning that the priests of Aaron's lineage should not venture beyond the borders of Israel. In doing so, they risk becoming defiled by corpse-uncleanness and, in turn, defile their offerings (which must needs be eaten by them in a state of ritual purity). Ashkelon was long deemed as one of such cities, as it was settled by gentiles and not conquered by Jews upon their return from the Babylonian exile. The Jerusalem Talmud (Shevi'it 6:1) relates how Rabbi Phinehas ben Jair, a priest of Aaron's lineage, and others with him, used to go down into the marketplace of the Saracens in Ashkelon to buy wheat during the Seventh Year, and return to their own city, and immerse themselves in order to eat their bread (Terumah) in a state of ritual purity.]

Caesarea Maritima
The maritime city of Caesarea was an enclave along the Mediterranean coast not immediately settled by Jewish émigrés returning from the Babylonian exile. Later, however, Jews joined the inhabitants of the city. In the 1st century CE, it was still principally settled by foreigners, mostly Grecians. To ease the strictures placed upon the poor of the Jewish nation during the Seventh Year (since planting was prohibited throughout that year, and after-growths could not be taken by the people), Rabbi Judah HaNasi (2nd century CE) released the city (and its bounds) from the obligation of tithing locally-grown produce, and from the restrictions associated with Seventh Year produce. Nevertheless, on certain products, the separation of the demai tithe was still required. 
(Translation of text - con't.)

Addendum: Permitted towns in region of Sebaste
Between the country of Judea and the country of Galilee lay an intermediate stretch of land known as "the strip of the Samaritans." Jews often passed through the region, while en route from Galilee to Jerusalem during the three annual pilgrimages, and again when returning home.

Although the region of Samaria was not seized at the very outset by those Jews returning from the Babylonian exile, the priests of Aaron's descent were still permitted to pass through that section of the country, without fear of experiencing defilement in respect to the country of the gentiles. Nonetheless, there were some places in Samaria that were exempt from tithes, as if they had been a foreign land.

The Jerusalem Talmud, when speaking about the impropriety of leaving the Land of Israel, describes the standard rule of practice of the time: "Said Rabbi Abbahu: 'There are hamlets belonging to the Samaritans wherein it has been customary to permit [a Jew's passage through them], since the days of Joshua, the son of Nun, and they are permitted' (i.e. released from the laws requiring tithing of produce)." 

The reason for this exemption is explained by Talmudic exegete, Solomon Sirilio, as being that these villages in Samaria and their suburbs had the status of feudal or usufruct lands given by grant from the state to farm-laborers. This was enough to exempt such produce from the requirement of tithing, since the kingdom (Ptolemaic, Roman, or otherwise) had not forfeited its hold over such lands, and since the Jewish regulations for tithing prescribe that produce or grain that is to be tithed must be the property of its tither. The following list of towns concerns those hamlets held by the state in the region of Sebaste (the biblical city of Samaria) and which were, therefore, exempt from the laws of tithing. The list is not known from any other source, and is only alluded to in the Jerusalem Talmud.
(Translation of text - con't.)

In Jewish Mishnaic law, the Samaritans were obligated to separate tithes from their produce, and where they were negligent, Jews who purchased such fruits and vegetables were required to separate the tithes before they could be eaten.  The towns in Samaria that were exempt from tithing have been understood to mean that they were farmsteads owned by non-Jewish landlords, which made the fruits grown in those villages permitted to be taken in the Seventh-year and in other years (see supra). Sussmann holds that they were "typically Grecian towns." In contrast, the Mishnah, compiled by Rabbi Judah HaNassi in 189 CE, mentions other cities and towns of Samaria, such as Badan and Gebaʻ, that require tithing of produce.

See also

 Impurity of the land of the nations
 Laws and customs of the Land of Israel in Judaism
 Shmita
 Tithes in Judaism
 Turos Amanus

References

Notes

Bibliography

Amar, Z. (2012). "Flora of the Bible: a new investigation aimed at identifying all of the plants of the Bible in light of Jewish sources and scientific research", pub. by Ruben Mass, Jerusalem 2012 

 (revised editions printed in 1951 [], in 1962 [], and in 1984 [])

Avi-Yonah, M. (1979). The Holy Land - from the Persian to the Arab Conquests (536 B.C. to A.D. 640) A Historical Geography, Grand Rapids, Michigan 

)
Hamitovsky, Itzhaq (2004). Changes and Developments of the Samaritan Settlement in the Land of Israel during the Hellenistic-Roman Period, Bar-Ilan University: Ramat-Gan (Hebrew)

Josephus (1926). Antiquities, Loeb Classical Library, ed. H.St.J. Thackeray, Heinemann: London 

 

, s.v. Roob

Muḳaddasi (1886), Description of Syria, Including Palestine, ed. Guy Le Strange, London

 (digitised 2006)
 

 (reprinted A. Hart: Philadelphia 1850)

 Sussmann, Jacob (1974). A Halakhic Inscription from the Beth-Shean Valley, pub. in journal Tarbiẕ (43): Mandel Institute for Jewish Studies, Jerusalem, pp. 88–158 (Hebrew)
 (Jacob Sussmann)
 (Jacob Sussmann)
 (first printed in Berlin 1899)

Urman, Dan & Flesher, Paul V.M. (1998). Ancient Synagogues: Historical Analysis and Archaeological Discovery, Brill: Leiden  (vol. 1);  (vol. 2)

Further reading 
 Lieberman, Saul (1976). "A Note to Tarbiz XLV, p. 61", Tarbiz 45, p. 331 (Hebrew)
 Sussmann, Jacob (1982). "The Inscription in the Synagogue at Rehob", in: Ancient Synagogues Revealed, ed. Lee I. Levine, Jerusalem / Detroit, pp. 146–53 
 Vitto, Fanny (1981). "A Byzantine Synagogue in the Beth Shean Valley", in: Temples and High Places in Biblical Times, ed. Avraham Biran, Jerusalem, pp. 164–67
 Vitto, Fanny (1981). "Jewish Villages around Beth Shean in the Roman and Byzantine Periods", Bulletin of the Anglo-Israel Archaeological Society 1, pp. 11–14
 Vitto, Fanny (1995). "The Interior Decoration of Palestinian Churches and Synagogues", Byzantinische Forschungen 21, ed. A. M. Hakkert and W. E. Kaegi, Jr., Amtersdam, pp. 283–300

External links
Description of Archaeological Site in Tel Farwana
Palestine Exploration Fund - Quarterly Statement for 1894 - Historical Geography
Map of the Holy Land / constructed by C.W.M. Van de Velde; 2nd edition, 1865
 Meir Bar-Ilan, 'What was the Purpose of the Tannaim in Describing the Borders of the Land of Israel?', Te‘uda’, 7 (1988-1991), pp. 95-110 (Hebrew). Abstract

4th-century inscriptions
1973 archaeological discoveries
Archaeological discoveries in Israel
Beit She'an
Israeli mosaics
Archaeology of Israel
Jews and Judaism in the Byzantine Empire
Jewish texts
Rabbinic literature
Byzantine mosaics
Ancient sites in Israel
Judaic inscriptions
Collections of the Israel Museum
Land of Israel
Historical geography
Ancient Jewish history
Mosaics
Jewish agrarian laws
Ancient Hebrew texts
Land of Israel laws in Judaism
Geography of Israel
Talmud places